David Diliberto (born April 29, 1970) is an American filmmaker.

As a longtime collaborator of Joel and Ethan Coen, Diliberto was a part of several innovations in post-production technologies.  He supervised the first Digital Intermediate on a full feature with the film O Brother, Where Art Thou?. The Coens' stylized film noir, The Man Who Wasn't There, provided analog hurdles rather than digital ones when several prints of that black & white film burned in projectors.  The special film stock used for the movie had a high silver content and had never been used for printing or projection. Trailing the industry abandonment of old-school film editing techniques, David configured Final Cut Pro systems that could emulate the Coens idiosyncratic method of editing in a digital realm. Intolerable Cruelty was the first major studio feature edited on Apple Computer's Final Cut Pro software.

Filmography
 Burn After Reading - Associate Producer
 Order Up  - Producer
 No Country For Old Men (film) - Associate Producer
 The Ladykillers - Associate Producer
 Intolerable Cruelty - Associate Editor
 Bob - Writer, Director
 The Man Who Wasn't There - Associate Editor
 A Pork Chop for Larry - Writer, Director
 O Brother Where Art Thou? - Associate Editor
 The Big Lebowski - Associate Editor
 Night Falls on Manhattan - Assistant Editor
 Fargo - Assistant Editor
 Something to Talk About (film) - Assistant Editor
 The Hudsucker Proxy - Apprentice Editor

References

External links

American filmmakers
American film editors
1970 births
Living people